A neutron star is the collapsed core of a massive supergiant star, which had a total mass of between 10 and 25 solar masses, possibly more if the star was especially metal-rich. Except for black holes and some hypothetical objects (e.g. white holes and quark stars), neutron stars are the smallest and densest currently known class of stellar objects. They result from the supernova explosion of a massive star, combined with gravitational collapse, that compresses the core past white dwarf star density to that of atomic nuclei.

Once formed, they no longer actively generate heat and cool over time; however, they may still evolve further through collision or accretion. Most of the basic models for these objects imply that neutron stars are composed almost entirely of neutrons (subatomic particles with no net electrical charge and with slightly larger mass than protons); the electrons and protons present in normal matter combine to produce neutrons at the conditions in a neutron star. Neutron stars are partially supported against further collapse by neutron degeneracy pressure, a phenomenon described by the Pauli exclusion principle, just as white dwarfs are supported against collapse by electron degeneracy pressure. However, neutron degeneracy pressure is not by itself sufficient to hold up an object beyond 0.7  and repulsive nuclear forces play a larger role in supporting more massive neutron stars. If the remnant star has a mass exceeding the Tolman–Oppenheimer–Volkoff limit of around 2 solar masses, the combination of degeneracy pressure and nuclear forces is insufficient to support the neutron star. It continues collapsing to form a black hole. The most massive neutron star detected so far, PSR J0952–0607, is estimated to be  solar masses.

Neutron star material is remarkably dense: a normal-sized matchbox containing neutron-star material would have a weight of approximately 3 billion tonnes, the same weight as a 0.5 cubic kilometre chunk of the Earth (a cube with edges of about 800 metres) from Earth's surface.

As the star's core collapses, its rotation rate increases due to conservation of angular momentum, and newly formed neutron stars rotate at up to several hundred times per second. Some neutron stars emit beams of electromagnetic radiation that make them detectable as pulsars. Indeed, the discovery of pulsars by Jocelyn Bell Burnell and Antony Hewish in 1967 was the first observational suggestion that neutron stars exist. The radiation from pulsars is thought to be primarily emitted from regions near their magnetic poles. If the magnetic poles do not coincide with the rotational axis of the neutron star, the emission beam will sweep the sky. When seen from a distance, if the observer is somewhere in the path of the beam, it will appear as pulses of radiation coming from a fixed point in space (the so-called "lighthouse effect").

There are thought to be around one billion neutron stars in the Milky Way, and at a minimum several hundred million, a figure obtained by estimating the number of stars that have undergone supernova explosions. However, most are old and cold and radiate very little; most neutron stars that have been detected occur only in certain situations in which they do radiate, such as if they are a pulsar or part of a binary system. Slow-rotating and non-accreting neutron stars are almost undetectable; however, since the Hubble Space Telescope detection of RX J1856.5−3754 in the 1990s, a few nearby neutron stars that appear to emit only thermal radiation have been detected. Soft gamma repeaters are conjectured to be a type of neutron star with very strong magnetic fields, known as magnetars, or alternatively, neutron stars with fossil disks around them.

Neutron stars in binary systems can undergo accretion which typically makes the system bright in X-rays while the material falling onto the neutron star can form hotspots that rotate in and out of view in identified X-ray pulsar systems. Additionally, such accretion can "recycle" old pulsars and potentially cause them to gain mass and spin-up to very fast rotation rates, forming the so-called millisecond pulsars. These binary systems will continue to evolve, and eventually the companions can become compact objects such as white dwarfs or neutron stars themselves, though other possibilities include a complete destruction of the companion through ablation or merger. The merger of binary neutron stars may be the source of short-duration gamma-ray bursts and are likely strong sources of gravitational waves. In 2017, a direct detection (GW170817) of the gravitational waves from such an event was observed, and gravitational waves have also been indirectly observed in a system where two neutron stars orbit each other.

Formation

Any main-sequence star with an initial mass of above 8 times the mass of the sun has the potential to produce a neutron star. As the star evolves away from the main sequence, subsequent nuclear burning produces an iron-rich core. When all nuclear fuel in the core has been exhausted, the core must be supported by degeneracy pressure alone. Further deposits of mass from shell burning cause the core to exceed the Chandrasekhar limit. At these temperatures, photodisintegration (the breaking up of iron nuclei into alpha particles by high-energy gamma rays) occurs. As the temperature climbs even higher, electrons and protons combine to form neutrons via electron capture, releasing a flood of neutrinos. The infalling outer envelope of the star is halted and flung outwards by a flux of neutrinos produced in the creation of the neutrons, becoming a supernova. The remnant left is a neutron star.

As the core of a massive star is compressed during a Type II supernova or a Type Ib or Type Ic supernova, and collapses into a neutron star, it retains most of its angular momentum. But, because it has only a tiny fraction of its parent's radius (sharply reducing its moment of inertia), a neutron star is formed with very high rotation speed, and then over a very long period, it slows. Neutron stars are known that have rotation periods from about 1.4 ms to 30 s. One measure of such immense gravity is the fact that neutron stars have an escape velocity of over half the speed of light. The neutron star's gravity accelerates infalling matter to tremendous speed, and tidal forces near the surface can cause spaghettification.

Properties

Mass and temperature

A neutron star has a mass of at least 1.1 solar masses.

At this lower temperature, most of the light generated by a neutron star is in X-rays.

Some researchers have proposed a neutron star classification system using Roman numerals (not to be confused with the Yerkes luminosity classes for non-degenerate stars) to sort neutron stars by their mass and cooling rates: type I for neutron stars with low mass and cooling rates, type II for neutron stars with higher mass and cooling rates, and a proposed type III for neutron stars with even higher mass, approaching , and with higher cooling rates and possibly candidates for exotic stars.

Density and pressure

In the enormous gravitational field of a neutron star, that teaspoon of material would weigh , which is 15 times what the Moon would weigh if it were placed on the surface of the Earth. The entire mass of the Earth at neutron star density would fit into a sphere of 305 m in diameter (the size of the Arecibo Telescope).

The equation of state of matter at such high densities is not precisely known because of the theoretical difficulties associated with extrapolating the likely behavior of quantum chromodynamics, superconductivity, and superfluidity of matter in such states. The problem is exacerbated by the empirical difficulties of observing the characteristics of any object that is hundreds of parsecs away, or farther.

A neutron star has some of the properties of an atomic nucleus, including density (within an order of magnitude) and being composed of nucleons. In popular scientific writing, neutron stars are therefore sometimes described as "giant nuclei". However, in other respects, neutron stars and atomic nuclei are quite different. A nucleus is held together by the strong interaction, whereas a neutron star is held together by gravity. The density of a nucleus is uniform, while neutron stars are predicted to consist of multiple layers with varying compositions and densities.

Magnetic field
These are orders of magnitude higher than in any other object: For comparison, a continuous 16 T field has been achieved in the laboratory and is sufficient to levitate a living frog due to diamagnetic levitation. Variations in magnetic field strengths are most likely the main factor that allows different types of neutron stars to be distinguished by their spectra, and explains the periodicity of pulsars.

The magnetic energy density of a  field is extreme, greatly exceeding the mass-energy density of ordinary matter. Fields of this strength are able to polarize the vacuum to the point that the vacuum becomes birefringent. Photons can merge or split in two, and virtual particle-antiparticle pairs are produced. The field changes electron energy levels and atoms are forced into thin cylinders. Unlike in an ordinary pulsar, magnetar spin-down can be directly powered by its magnetic field, and the magnetic field is strong enough to stress the crust to the point of fracture. Fractures of the crust cause starquakes, observed as extremely luminous millisecond hard gamma ray bursts. The fireball is trapped by the magnetic field, and comes in and out of view when the star rotates, which is observed as a periodic soft gamma repeater (SGR) emission with a period of 5–8 seconds and which lasts for a few minutes.

The origins of the strong magnetic field are as yet unclear. One hypothesis is that of "flux freezing", or conservation of the original magnetic flux during the formation of the neutron star. If an object has a certain magnetic flux over its surface area, and that area shrinks to a smaller area, but the magnetic flux is conserved, then the magnetic field would correspondingly increase. Likewise, a collapsing star begins with a much larger surface area than the resulting neutron star, and conservation of magnetic flux would result in a far stronger magnetic field. However, this simple explanation does not fully explain magnetic field strengths of neutron stars.

Gravity and equation of state

Such a strong gravitational field acts as a gravitational lens and bends the radiation emitted by the neutron star such that parts of the normally invisible rear surface become visible.
If the radius of the neutron star is 3GM/c2 or less, then the photons may be trapped in an orbit, thus making the whole surface of that neutron star visible from a single vantage point, along with destabilizing photon orbits at or below the 1 radius distance of the star.

A fraction of the mass of a star that collapses to form a neutron star is released in the supernova explosion from which it forms (from the law of mass–energy equivalence). The energy comes from the gravitational binding energy of a neutron star.

Hence, the gravitational force of a typical neutron star is huge. If an object were to fall from a height of one meter on a neutron star 12 kilometers in radius, it would reach the ground at around 1400 kilometers per second. However, even before impact, the tidal force would cause spaghettification, breaking any sort of an ordinary object into a stream of material.

Because of the enormous gravity, time dilation between a neutron star and Earth is significant. For example, eight years could pass on the surface of a neutron star, yet ten years would have passed on Earth, not including the time-dilation effect of the star's very rapid rotation.

Neutron star relativistic equations of state describe the relation of radius vs. mass for various models. The most likely radii for a given neutron star mass are bracketed by models AP4 (smallest radius) and MS2 (largest radius). EB is the ratio of gravitational binding energy mass equivalent to the observed neutron star gravitational mass of M kilograms with radius R meters,

Given current values

and star masses "M" commonly reported as multiples of one solar mass,

then the relativistic fractional binding energy of a neutron star is

A  neutron star would not be more compact than 10,970 meters radius (AP4 model). Its mass fraction gravitational binding energy would then be 0.187, −18.7% (exothermic). This is not near 0.6/2 = 0.3, −30%.

The equation of state for a neutron star is not yet known. It is assumed that it differs significantly from that of a white dwarf, whose equation of state is that of a degenerate gas that can be described in close agreement with special relativity. However, with a neutron star the increased effects of general relativity can no longer be ignored. Several equations of state have been proposed (FPS, UU, APR, L, SLy, and others) and current research is still attempting to constrain the theories to make predictions of neutron star matter. This means that the relation between density and mass is not fully known, and this causes uncertainties in radius estimates. For example, a  neutron star could have a radius of 10.7, 11.1, 12.1 or 15.1 kilometers (for EOS FPS, UU, APR or L respectively).

Structure

Current understanding of the structure of neutron stars is defined by existing mathematical models, but it might be possible to infer some details through studies of neutron-star oscillations. Asteroseismology, a study applied to ordinary stars, can reveal the inner structure of neutron stars by analyzing observed spectra of stellar oscillations.

Current models indicate that matter at the surface of a neutron star is composed of ordinary atomic nuclei crushed into a solid lattice with a sea of electrons flowing through the gaps between them. It is possible that the nuclei at the surface are iron, due to iron's high binding energy per nucleon. It is also possible that heavy elements, such as iron, simply sink beneath the surface, leaving only light nuclei like helium and hydrogen. If the surface temperature exceeds  (as in the case of a young pulsar), the surface should be fluid instead of the solid phase that might exist in cooler neutron stars (temperature <).

The "atmosphere" of a neutron star is hypothesized to be at most several micrometres thick, and its dynamics are fully controlled by the neutron star's magnetic field. Below the atmosphere one encounters a solid "crust". This crust is extremely hard and very smooth (with maximum surface irregularities on the order of millimetres or less), due to the extreme gravitational field.

Proceeding inward, one encounters nuclei with ever-increasing numbers of neutrons; such nuclei would decay quickly on Earth, but are kept stable by tremendous pressures. As this process continues at increasing depths, the neutron drip becomes overwhelming, and the concentration of free neutrons increases rapidly. In that region, there are nuclei, free electrons, and free neutrons. The nuclei become increasingly small (gravity and pressure overwhelming the strong force) until the core is reached, by definition the point where mostly neutrons exist. The expected hierarchy of phases of nuclear matter in the inner crust has been characterized as "nuclear pasta", with fewer voids and larger structures towards higher pressures.
The composition of the superdense matter in the core remains uncertain. One model describes the core as superfluid neutron-degenerate matter (mostly neutrons, with some protons and electrons). More exotic forms of matter are possible, including degenerate strange matter (containing strange quarks in addition to up and down quarks), matter containing high-energy pions and kaons in addition to neutrons, or ultra-dense quark-degenerate matter.

Radiation

Pulsars

Neutron stars are detected from their electromagnetic radiation. Neutron stars are usually observed to pulse radio waves and other electromagnetic radiation, and neutron stars observed with pulses are called pulsars.

Pulsars' radiation is thought to be caused by particle acceleration near their magnetic poles, which need not be aligned with the rotational axis of the neutron star. It is thought that a large electrostatic field builds up near the magnetic poles, leading to electron emission. These electrons are magnetically accelerated along the field lines, leading to curvature radiation, with the radiation being strongly polarized towards the plane of curvature. In addition, high-energy photons can interact with lower-energy photons and the magnetic field for electron−positron pair production, which through electron–positron annihilation leads to further high-energy photons.

The radiation emanating from the magnetic poles of neutron stars can be described as magnetospheric radiation, in reference to the magnetosphere of the neutron star. It is not to be confused with magnetic dipole radiation, which is emitted because the magnetic axis is not aligned with the rotational axis, with a radiation frequency the same as the neutron star's rotational frequency.

If the axis of rotation of the neutron star is different from the magnetic axis, external viewers will only see these beams of radiation whenever the magnetic axis point towards them during the neutron star rotation. Therefore, periodic pulses are observed, at the same rate as the rotation of the neutron star.

In May 2022, astronomers reported an ultra-long-period radio-emitting neutron star PSR J0901-4046, with spin properties distinct from the known neutron stars. It is unclear how its radio emission is generated, and it challenges the current understanding of how pulsars evolve.

Non-pulsating neutron stars
In addition to pulsars, non-pulsating neutron stars have also been identified, although they may have minor periodic variation in luminosity. This seems to be a characteristic of the X-ray sources known as Central Compact Objects in Supernova remnants (CCOs in SNRs), which are thought to be young, radio-quiet isolated neutron stars.

Spectra
In addition to radio emissions, neutron stars have also been identified in other parts of the electromagnetic spectrum. This includes visible light, near infrared, ultraviolet, X-rays, and gamma rays. Pulsars observed in X-rays are known as X-ray pulsars if accretion-powered, while those identified in visible light are known as optical pulsars. The majority of neutron stars detected, including those identified in optical, X-ray, and gamma rays, also emit radio waves; the Crab Pulsar produces electromagnetic emissions across the spectrum. However, there exist neutron stars called radio-quiet neutron stars, with no radio emissions detected.

Rotation

Neutron stars rotate extremely rapidly after their formation due to the conservation of angular momentum; in analogy to spinning ice skaters pulling in their arms, the slow rotation of the original star's core speeds up as it shrinks. A newborn neutron star can rotate many times a second.

Spin down

Over time, neutron stars slow, as their rotating magnetic fields in effect radiate energy associated with the rotation; older neutron stars may take several seconds for each revolution. This is called spin down. The rate at which a neutron star slows its rotation is usually constant and very small.

The periodic time (P) is the rotational period, the time for one rotation of a neutron star. The spin-down rate, the rate of slowing of rotation, is then given the symbol  (P-dot), the derivative of P with respect to time. It is defined as periodic time increase per unit time; it is a dimensionless quantity, but can be given the units of s⋅s−1 (seconds per second).

As a neutron star ages, its rotation slows (as P increases); eventually, the rate of rotation will become too slow to power the radio-emission mechanism, and the neutron star can no longer be detected.

P and P-dot allow minimum magnetic fields of neutron stars to be estimated. P and P-dot can be also used to calculate the characteristic age of a pulsar, but gives an estimate which is somewhat larger than the true age when it is applied to young pulsars.

P and P-dot can also be combined with neutron star's moment of inertia to estimate a quantity called spin-down luminosity, which is given the symbol  (E-dot). It is not the measured luminosity, but rather the calculated loss rate of rotational energy that would manifest itself as radiation. For neutron stars where the spin-down luminosity is comparable to the actual luminosity, the neutron stars are said to be "rotation powered". The observed luminosity of the Crab Pulsar is comparable to the spin-down luminosity, supporting the model that rotational kinetic energy powers the radiation from it. With neutron stars such as magnetars, where the actual luminosity exceeds the spin-down luminosity by about a factor of one hundred, it is assumed that the luminosity is powered by magnetic dissipation, rather than being rotation powered.

P and P-dot can also be plotted for neutron stars to create a P–P-dot diagram. It encodes a tremendous amount of information about the pulsar population and its properties, and has been likened to the Hertzsprung–Russell diagram in its importance for neutron stars.

Spin up

Neutron star rotational speeds can increase, a process known as spin up. Sometimes neutron stars absorb orbiting matter from companion stars, increasing the rotation rate and reshaping the neutron star into an oblate spheroid. This causes an increase in the rate of rotation of the neutron star of over a hundred times per second in the case of millisecond pulsars.

The most rapidly rotating neutron star currently known, PSR J1748-2446ad, rotates at 716 revolutions per second. A 2007 paper reported the detection of an X-ray burst oscillation, which provides an indirect measure of spin, of 1122 Hz from the neutron star XTE J1739-285, suggesting 1122 rotations a second. However, at present, this signal has only been seen once, and should be regarded as tentative until confirmed in another burst from that star.

Glitches and starquakes

Sometimes a neutron star will undergo a glitch, a sudden small increase of its rotational speed or spin up. Glitches are thought to be the effect of a starquake—as the rotation of the neutron star slows, its shape becomes more spherical. Due to the stiffness of the "neutron" crust, this happens as discrete events when the crust ruptures, creating a starquake similar to earthquakes. After the starquake, the star will have a smaller equatorial radius, and because angular momentum is conserved, its rotational speed has increased.

Starquakes occurring in magnetars, with a resulting glitch, is the leading hypothesis for the gamma-ray sources known as soft gamma repeaters.

Recent work, however, suggests that a starquake would not release sufficient energy for a neutron star glitch; it has been suggested that glitches may instead be caused by transitions of vortices in the theoretical superfluid core of the neutron star from one metastable energy state to a lower one, thereby releasing energy that appears as an increase in the rotation rate.

Anti-glitches

An anti-glitch, a sudden small decrease in rotational speed, or spin down, of a neutron star has also been reported. It occurred in the magnetar 1E 2259+586, that in one case produced an X-ray luminosity increase of a factor of 20, and a significant spin-down rate change. Current neutron star models do not predict this behavior. If the cause were internal this suggests differential rotation of the solid outer crust and the superfluid component of the magnetar's inner structure.

Population and distances

At present, there are about 3,200 known neutron stars in the Milky Way and the Magellanic Clouds, the majority of which have been detected as radio pulsars. Neutron stars are mostly concentrated along the disk of the Milky Way, although the spread perpendicular to the disk is large because the supernova explosion process can impart high translational speeds (400 km/s) to the newly formed neutron star.

Some of the closest known neutron stars are RX J1856.5−3754, which is about 400 light-years from Earth, and PSR J0108−1431 about 424 light years. RX J1856.5-3754 is a member of a close group of neutron stars called The Magnificent Seven. Another nearby neutron star that was detected transiting the backdrop of the constellation Ursa Minor has been nicknamed Calvera by its Canadian and American discoverers, after the villain in the 1960 film The Magnificent Seven. This rapidly moving object was discovered using the ROSAT/Bright Source Catalog.

Neutron stars are only detectable with modern technology during the earliest stages of their lives (almost always less than 1 million years) and are vastly outnumbered by older neutron stars that would only be detectable through their blackbody radiation and gravitational effects on other stars.

Binary neutron star systems

About 5% of all known neutron stars are members of a binary system. The formation and evolution of binary neutron stars and double neutron stars can be a complex process. Neutron stars have been observed in binaries with ordinary main-sequence stars, red giants, white dwarfs, or other neutron stars. According to modern theories of binary evolution, it is expected that neutron stars also exist in binary systems with black hole companions. The merger of binaries containing two neutron stars, or a neutron star and a black hole, has been observed through the emission of gravitational waves.

X-ray binaries

Binary systems containing neutron stars often emit X-rays, which are emitted by hot gas as it falls towards the surface of the neutron star. The source of the gas is the companion star, the outer layers of which can be stripped off by the gravitational force of the neutron star if the two stars are sufficiently close. As the neutron star accretes this gas, its mass can increase; if enough mass is accreted, the neutron star may collapse into a black hole.

Neutron star binary mergers and nucleosynthesis

The distance between two neutron stars in a close binary system is observed to shrink as gravitational waves are emitted. Ultimately, the neutron stars will come into contact and coalesce.
The coalescence of binary neutron stars is one of the leading models for the origin of short gamma-ray bursts. Strong evidence for this model came from the observation of a kilonova associated with the short-duration gamma-ray burst GRB 130603B, and finally confirmed by detection of gravitational wave GW170817 and short GRB 170817A by LIGO, Virgo, and 70 observatories covering the electromagnetic spectrum observing the event. The light emitted in the kilonova is believed to come from the radioactive decay of material ejected in the merger of the two neutron stars. This material may be responsible for the production of many of the chemical elements beyond iron, as opposed to the supernova nucleosynthesis theory.

Planets

Neutron stars can host exoplanets. These can be original, circumbinary, captured, or the result of a second round of planet formation. Pulsars can also strip the atmosphere off from a star, leaving a planetary-mass remnant, which may be understood as a chthonian planet or a stellar object depending on interpretation. For pulsars, such pulsar planets can be detected with the pulsar timing method, which allows for high precision and detection of much smaller planets than with other methods. Two systems have been definitively confirmed. The first exoplanets ever to be detected were the three planets Draugr, Poltergeist and Phobetor around PSR B1257+12, discovered in 1992–1994. Of these, Draugr is the smallest exoplanet ever detected, at a mass of twice that of the Moon. Another system is PSR B1620−26, where a circumbinary planet orbits a neutron star-white dwarf binary system. Also, there are several unconfirmed candidates. Pulsar planets receive little visible light, but massive amounts of ionizing radiation and high-energy stellar wind, which makes them rather hostile environments to life as presently understood.

History of discoveries

At the meeting of the American Physical Society in December 1933 (the proceedings were published in January 1934), Walter Baade and Fritz Zwicky proposed the existence of neutron stars, less than two years after the discovery of the neutron by James Chadwick. In seeking an explanation for the origin of a supernova, they tentatively proposed that in supernova explosions ordinary stars are turned into stars that consist of extremely closely packed neutrons that they called neutron stars. Baade and Zwicky correctly proposed at that time that the release of the gravitational binding energy of the neutron stars powers the supernova: "In the supernova process, mass in bulk is annihilated". Neutron stars were thought to be too faint to be detectable and little work was done on them until November 1967, when Franco Pacini pointed out that if the neutron stars were spinning and had large magnetic fields, then electromagnetic waves would be emitted. Unbeknownst to him, radio astronomer Antony Hewish and his graduate student Jocelyn Bell at Cambridge were shortly to detect radio pulses from stars that are now believed to be highly magnetized, rapidly spinning neutron stars, known as pulsars.

In 1965, Antony Hewish and Samuel Okoye discovered "an unusual source of high radio brightness temperature in the Crab Nebula". This source turned out to be the Crab Pulsar that resulted from the great supernova of 1054.

In 1967, Iosif Shklovsky examined the X-ray and optical observations of Scorpius X-1 and correctly concluded that the radiation comes from a neutron star at the stage of accretion.

In 1967, Jocelyn Bell Burnell and Antony Hewish discovered regular radio pulses from PSR B1919+21. This pulsar was later interpreted as an isolated, rotating neutron star. The energy source of the pulsar is the rotational energy of the neutron star. The majority of known neutron stars (about 2000, as of 2010) have been discovered as pulsars, emitting regular radio pulses.

In 1968, Richard V. E. Lovelace and collaborators discovered period  ms of the Crab pulsar using Arecibo Observatory. After this discovery, scientists concluded that pulsars were rotating neutron stars. Before that, many scientists believed that pulsars were pulsating white dwarfs.

In 1971, Riccardo Giacconi, Herbert Gursky, Ed Kellogg, R. Levinson, E. Schreier, and H. Tananbaum discovered 4.8 second pulsations in an X-ray source in the constellation Centaurus, Cen X-3. They interpreted this as resulting from a rotating hot neutron star. The energy source is gravitational and results from a rain of gas falling onto the surface of the neutron star from a companion star or the interstellar medium.

In 1974, Antony Hewish was awarded the Nobel Prize in Physics "for his decisive role in the discovery of pulsars" without Jocelyn Bell who shared in the discovery.

In 1974, Joseph Taylor and Russell Hulse discovered the first binary pulsar, PSR B1913+16, which consists of two neutron stars (one seen as a pulsar) orbiting around their center of mass. Albert Einstein's general theory of relativity predicts that massive objects in short binary orbits should emit gravitational waves, and thus that their orbit should decay with time. This was indeed observed, precisely as general relativity predicts, and in 1993, Taylor and Hulse were awarded the Nobel Prize in Physics for this discovery.

In 1982, Don Backer and colleagues discovered the first millisecond pulsar, PSR B1937+21. This object spins 642 times per second, a value that placed fundamental constraints on the mass and radius of neutron stars. Many millisecond pulsars were later discovered, but PSR B1937+21 remained the fastest-spinning known pulsar for 24 years, until PSR J1748-2446ad (which spins ~716 times a second) was discovered.

In 2003, Marta Burgay and colleagues discovered the first double neutron star system where both components are detectable as pulsars, PSR J0737−3039. The discovery of this system allows a total of 5 different tests of general relativity, some of these with unprecedented precision.

In 2010, Paul Demorest and colleagues measured the mass of the millisecond pulsar PSR J1614−2230 to be , using Shapiro delay. This was substantially higher than any previously measured neutron star mass (see PSR J1903+0327), and places strong constraints on the interior composition of neutron stars.

In 2013, John Antoniadis and colleagues measured the mass of PSR J0348+0432 to be , using white dwarf spectroscopy. This confirmed the existence of such massive stars using a different method. Furthermore, this allowed, for the first time, a test of general relativity using such a massive neutron star.

In August 2017, LIGO and Virgo made first detection of gravitational waves produced by colliding neutron stars.

In October 2018, astronomers reported that GRB 150101B, a gamma-ray burst event detected in 2015, may be directly related to the historic GW170817 and associated with the merger of two neutron stars. The similarities between the two events, in terms of gamma ray, optical and x-ray emissions, as well as to the nature of the associated host galaxies, are "striking", suggesting the two separate events may both be the result of the merger of neutron stars, and both may be a kilonova, which may be more common in the universe than previously understood, according to the researchers.

In July 2019, astronomers reported that a new method to determine the Hubble constant, and resolve the discrepancy of earlier methods, has been proposed based on the mergers of pairs of neutron stars, following the detection of the neutron star merger of GW170817.

A 2020 study by University of Southampton PhD student Fabian Gittins suggested that surface irregularities ("mountains") may only be fractions of a millimeter tall (about 0.000003% of the neutron star's diameter), hundreds of times smaller than previously predicted, a result bearing implications for the non-detection of gravitational waves from spinning neutron stars.

Subtypes table

 Neutron star
 Isolated neutron star (INS): not in a binary system.
 Rotation-powered pulsar (RPP or "radio pulsar"): neutron stars that emit directed pulses of radiation towards us at regular intervals (due to their strong magnetic fields).
 Rotating radio transient (RRATs): are thought to be pulsars which emit more sporadically and/or with higher pulse-to-pulse variability than the bulk of the known pulsars.
 Magnetar: a neutron star with an extremely strong magnetic field (1000 times more than a regular neutron star), and long rotation periods (5 to 12 seconds).
 Soft gamma repeater (SGR).
 Anomalous X-ray pulsar (AXP).
 Radio-quiet neutron stars.
 X-ray dim isolated neutron stars.
 Central compact objects in supernova remnants (CCOs in SNRs): young, radio-quiet non-pulsating X-ray sources, thought to be Isolated Neutron Stars surrounded by supernova remnants.
 X-ray pulsars or "accretion-powered pulsars": a class of X-ray binaries.
 Low-mass X-ray binary pulsars: a class of low-mass X-ray binaries (LMXB), a pulsar with a main sequence star, white dwarf or red giant.
 Millisecond pulsar (MSP) ("recycled pulsar").
 "Spider Pulsar", a pulsar where their companion is a semi-degenerate star.
 "Black Widow" pulsar, a pulsar that falls under the "Spider Pulsar" if the companion has extremely low mass (less than 0.1 solar masses).
 "Redback" pulsar, are if the companion is more massive.
 Sub-millisecond pulsar.
 X-ray burster: a neutron star with a low mass binary companion from which matter is accreted resulting in irregular bursts of energy from the surface of the neutron star.
 Intermediate-mass X-ray binary pulsars: a class of intermediate-mass X-ray binaries (IMXB), a pulsar with an intermediate mass star.
 High-mass X-ray binary pulsars: a class of high-mass X-ray binaries (HMXB), a pulsar with a massive star.
 Binary pulsars: a pulsar with a binary companion, often a white dwarf or neutron star.
 X-ray tertiary (theorized).
 Theorized compact stars with similar properties.
 Protoneutron star (PNS), theorized.
 Exotic star
 Thorne–Żytkow object: currently a hypothetical merger of a neutron star into a red giant star.
 Quark star: currently a hypothetical type of neutron star composed of quark matter, or strange matter. As of 2018, there are three candidates.
 Electroweak star: currently a hypothetical type of extremely heavy neutron star, in which the quarks are converted to leptons through the electroweak force, but the gravitational collapse of the neutron star is prevented by radiation pressure. As of 2018, there is no evidence for their existence.
 Preon star: currently a hypothetical type of neutron star composed of preon matter. As of 2018, there is no evidence for the existence of preons.

Examples of neutron stars

 Black Widow Pulsar – a millisecond pulsar that is very massive.
 LGM-1 (now known as PSR B1919+21) – the first recognized radio-pulsar. It was discovered by Jocelyn Bell Burnell in 1967.
 PSR B1257+12 – the first neutron star discovered with planets (a millisecond pulsar).
 PSR B1509−58 – source of the "Hand of God" photo shot by the Chandra X-ray Observatory.
 RX J1856.5−3754 – the closest neutron star.
 The Magnificent Seven – a group of nearby, X-ray dim isolated neutron stars.
 PSR J0348+0432 – the most massive neutron star with a well-constrained mass, 2.01 ± 0.04 .
 SWIFT J1756.9-2508 – a millisecond pulsar with a stellar-type companion with planetary range mass (below brown dwarf).
Swift J1818.0-1607 – the youngest known magnetar.

Gallery

See also

 Dragon's Egg
Neutron star merger
 Neutronium
 Preon-degenerate matter
 Rotating radio transient
 Little green men
IRAS 00500+6713 (in 10,000 y)

Notes

References

Sources

External links

 Introduction to neutron stars
 
 
 NASA on pulsars
 "NASA Sees Hidden Structure Of Neutron Star In Starquake". SpaceDaily.com. April 26, 2006
 "Mysterious X-ray sources may be lone neutron stars" David Shiga. New Scientist. 23 June 2006
 "Massive neutron star rules out exotic matter". New Scientist. According to a new analysis, exotic states of matter such as free quarks or BECs do not arise inside neutron stars.
 "Neutron star clocked at mind-boggling velocity". New Scientist. A neutron star has been clocked traveling at more than 1500 kilometers per second.

 
Star types
Exotic matter
Articles containing video clips
Compact stars